Hsinchu Airport is an airport and military airbase in North District, Hsinchu City, Taiwan. It  was constructed during the era of Japanese rule on 19 May 1936 and was named . As of the late 1990s, the longest runway at Hsinchu was reportedly 12,000 feet (3658 m) long.

Stationed at Hsinchu AB:
 499th Tactical Fighter Wing
 41 Sqn (Mirage 2000-5)
 42 Sqn (Mirage 2000–5)
 48 Sqn (Mirage 2000–5).

History
In July 2020, a Bell OH-58 Kiowa helicopter crashed at Hsinchu Air Force base, killing the two pilots.

See also
 Republic of China Air Force

References

1998 establishments in Taiwan
Airports in Taiwan
Republic of China Air Force
Buildings and structures in Hsinchu
Transportation in Hsinchu